Anthony "Tony" Tursi (February 16, 1901 – April 22, 1989) was an Italian-American organized crime figure associated with San Juan, Puerto Rico from the 1950s to the 1970s. Within the history of crime in Puerto Rico, he attracted notice primarily for owning the notable nightclub La Riviera.

While his operations faced frequent interruptions by the Puerto Rican government, he managed to achieve success in the territory's underworld for many years. One particular raid, he later recalled, had involved the arrest of over 300 women by anti-vice officers. The "farce", as he called it, of police raids wound up frightening prostitutes off of the streets and rebounding things in his favor, with Tursi controlling his own established locations. Historian Stan Steiner labeled him as a "night-club impresario".

La Riviera
Tursi gained fame as the owner of the La Riviera, a nightclub in San Juan, Puerto Rico well known for its association with easy prostitution. A popular attraction for not only locals but also expatriates and tourists, La Riveria faced the danger of constant raids by the police, though this didn't phase Tursi.

In the 1970s, societal changes marked the decline of his club. Tursi would say "I’m going broke because people are now getting for free what we used to charge for!" Tursi repeatedly rejected suggestions to turn La Riviera into an LGBT-themed disco as he found the idea personally offensive. Tursi finally agreed to sell his nightclub to the government, which promptly demolished it.

Politics
Tursi also took interest in civic affairs. He ran unsuccessfully for Mayor of San Juan as a political independent in 1968. His write-in campaign used the simple slogan "Vota Por Tursi".

He also provided poor children with parties on Thanksgiving, Christmas and Three Kings Day.

Imprisonment
In 1976, Tursi and his son Philip Tursi pleaded guilty to possessing 2,400 stolen blank tickets for Eastern Airlines. Part of the plea bargain deal involved granting youthful offender status and probation to Philip. On February 20, 1976, the court fined Anthony Tursi $5,000 and sentenced him to five years' imprisonment, to be served consecutively to a sentence in Puerto Rico. The court also sentenced fined Philip Tursi $5,000 and sentenced him to imprisonment of one year and one day. Anthony Tursi later appealed the verdict based on Philip's sentence, but the appeal was denied.

Death
He was released on November 30, 1979. Tursi then retired to Nevada, where he died on April 22, 1989.

See also

 List of Puerto Ricans
 List of crime bosses

References

1989 deaths
American gangsters of Italian descent
Puerto Rican criminals
People from San Juan, Puerto Rico
Prisoners and detainees of the United States federal government
American prisoners and detainees
1901 births